Wala Na Bang Pag-ibig is a romantic drama produced by VIVA Films in 1997.

Plot
Childhood friends Eric, (Bobby Andrews), Gemma (Angelu de Leon) and Ponsie (Mel Martinez) are elated when they learn they would be classmates in Manila as well. Eric is the weak, fickle-minded playboy. Gemma is the pretty tomboy content to look for girls for her friend Eric. Ponsie, on the other hand, is their gay friend. The situation remains ideal until the arrival of Gemma's cousin, Vivian (Mariel Lopez), who wants Eric as a boyfriend and Gemma promises to make it happen. But Vivian leaves for a three-week stay in the states for an art exhibit and competition. This separation triggers Gemma and Eric to realise and declare their long-hidden feelings for each other. When Vivian returns home to surprise Eric, she gets a surprise instead when she catches an affectionate Gemma and Eric. They fail to resolve the problem because of Eric's inability to decide. He claims to love both Vivian and Gemma. Vivian declares she's not giving up Eric without a fight, never mind if all of them suffers. Realising the futility of it all, Gemma heads back for the province. Will true love triumph over loyalty? Will setting something free really make it come back?

Cast

 Angelu de Leon as Gemma
 Bobby Andrews as Eric
 Mel Martinez as Ponsie

References

External links

1997 films
Philippine comedy films
Philippine romantic drama films
Filipino-language films
Films directed by Mac Alejandre